Wai Phyo Han (born 27 December 1984) is a Burmese politician, writer and former engineer who has been the MP of the Yangon Region Hluttaw for Insein No. 2 constituency since the 2015 general election. He is also undertaking as a secretary of a parliamentary committee which are concerning with transportation, communication, construction and industry affairs.

Early life and career 

Wai Phyo Han was born on 27 December 1984 in Yangon to parent San Maung and Nan Nan Win. He was graduated in bachelor of Mechanical Engineering from Yangon Technological University and received a Post Graduate Diploma in Law from University of Distance Education, Yangon. Before work in political field, he worked in engineering field as well as Myanmar and Singapore. He is the director of the Best Btothers United Company.

As a writer

Wai Phyo Han has been writing articles under the his pen name Wai Phyo Han (Insein) and more than 250 articles have been written in State-owned newspapers such as New Light of Myanmar and The Mirror, The Standard Times Daily, The Politics Journal, Public Image Journal, Hanthawaddy Times Journal, Bago Voice Journal and Youth Magazine etc.,.

The first printed article of his life was "A Letter of how I Feel" (ခံစားမိသလိုရေးတဲ့စာ). The author was mentioned in the People's Journal, led by the famous author Maung Wuntha and Pe Myint. His book Letters to the Grandfather (ဘကြီးဖြိုးထံပေးစာ) was released in 2017.

In February 2020, he published his second book named "Experience about MP", was collective his articles.

Political career
Wai Phyo Han joined the National League for Democracy in 2012 before the by-election. Since he became NLD member, he involved many political activities in the township and supporting to the Insein public.

In the 2015 Myanmar general election, he contested the Yangon Region Hluttaw from Insein Township No.2 parliamentary constituency and won a seat. He is most known because of the Yangon Bus Service (YBS) proposal. That proposal submitted on 5 April 2017. His comments were critical of Yangon Region Chief Minister Phyo Min Thein's YBS system. The system has been replaced by a new one, but there are still problems. That's why the government is urging us to come up with better ways. Twenty-seven parliamentarians enthusiastically discussed his proposal.

In 2017, Wai Phyo Han and three other Insein MPs tried to get land and budget for Insein Township Hall which was never happened in Insein Township 100 years age. Because of he and other three Insein MPs continuously effort at Hluttaw, they got a land for townhall in 2018 and then, they tried to get budget to construct townhall in 2018-2019 budget. The construction of townhall has been started in March 2019 and completely finished in September 2019 and officially opened on 21 November 2019. This Insein township project materialized is very remarkable milestone for Insein MPs and Insein publics.

He is a leading member of Insein Township's COVID-19 Protection, Controlling and Treating Working Committee. He tried to get suitable building for Quarantine patient and donation from donors (in kind and in cash). He used to relay the up date news to Insein township public about COVID-19. Wai Phyo Han also meeting and encourage the Quarantine patient and gave the moral support.

Work
 Letters to the Grandfather (ဘကြီးဖြိုးထံပေးစာ) (2017)
Experience about MP (2020)

References

External links

1984 births
National League for Democracy politicians
Living people
People from Yangon